Pousette is a Swedish family name of Walloon origin.

Pousette is one of Sweden's largest Walloon families and the name was originally written Poncet. The family has a strong connection to the forges in northern Uppland, where the family members worked mainly during the first century after arriving in Sweden in the 1620s. Ancestors of the family are the brothers Gottfrid and Martin Pousette who signed contracts in Liège in eastern Belgium in 1627 and from 1629 worked at Lövsta forge. Gottfrid Pousette worked at Forsmark forge 1640–1649 and was a few years later at Gimo forge while Martin Pousette worked at Österby forge and at the forge in Nora before he was active at the forge in Hillebola from 1644 until 1651.

In the Swedish family calendars of 1963 and 1974, the Gävle branch of the family is said to have originated from the wholesaler and shipowner Johan Fredrik Pousette (1816–1880).

Genealogy of prominent members
Gottfrid Pousette (lived at least between 1595 and 1651), smelter, Gimo forge
Frans Pousette (ca 1615–1691), smelter, Österby forge
Gottfrid Pousette (ca 1645–1731), smelter, Österby forge
Gottfrid Pousette (1685–1731), hammersmith, Österby forge
Jakob Pousette (1719–1768), bookkeeper, Österby forge
Henrik Pousette (1753–1821), smelter, Österby forge
Johan Jakob Pousette (1796–1839), blacksmith, Österby forge
Charlotta Pousette (1836–1921)
Alma Matilda Hübinette (1861–1899), married to John Morén, church musician, composer
Noak Pousette (ca 1622–1703), smelter, miller, Österby forge
Noak Pousette (1669–1749), smelter, Skebo forge
Johan Pousette (1712–1790), smelter, Skebo forge
Johan Pousette (1753–1829), smelter, Skebo forge
Johan Raphael Pousette (1775–1844), foreman, Edsbro blast furnace
Johan Pousette (1802–1881), driver, veterinarian
August Ferdinand Pousette (1830–1881), hammermaker, smelter
Johan Peter Pousette (1852–1932), smelter in Brattfors
Karl Hjalmar Pousette (1880–1950), ironworker
Rune Pousette (1917–2008), first  bureau secretary of the Royal Railway Board then director of the bureau at SJ
Åke Pousette (born 1949), professor
Karolina Pousette (1862–1941), married Wilhelm Zakarias Wilhelmsson, ironworker
Sigurd Pousette (1892–1946), correspondent
Ingemar Pousette (1926–2000), engineer, CEO
Per Magnus Pousette (1805–1888), park ranger, Edsbro
Karl Johan Pousette (1829–1897), park ranger, Edsbro
Magnus Fridolf Pousette (1864–1935), park ranger, Edsbro
Karl Vilhelm Pousette (1889–1980), sawmill worker, machinist, Edsbro
Dan Wilhelm Pousette (1915–1984)
Tomas Pousette (born 1950), economist
Martin Pousette (ca 1610–1651), smelter, Hillebola forge
Mårten Pousette (1646–1702), Älvkarleö forge
Mårten Pousette (1675–1745), master hammersmith, Älvkarleö forge
Johan Pousette (1718–1760), blacksmith, Älvkarleö forge
Mårten Pousette (1752–1797), blacksmith, Älvkarleö forge
Lars Pousette (1781–1837), master hammersmith, Älvkarleö forge
Lars Gustav Pousette (born 1809), blast furnace worker, foreman, Gysinge forge
Lars Fredrik Pousette (1832–1902), master hammersmith, Gysinge forge
Karl Fredrik Pousette (1859–1910), carpenter, Gysinge forge then Stockholm
Gerda Kristina Pousette (1892–1983), married to Simon Svensson, engineer and architect, they had children who took on the name Pousette
Johan Fredrik Pousette (1816–1880), wholesaler, shipowner in Gävle, started the Gävle branch
Fredrik Pousette (1851–1905), captain, landowner
Harald Pousette (1886–1975), diplomat, married Cecilia Cedercrantz, daughter of Conrad Cedercrantz and Elisabeth Sjöcrona
Tage Pousette (1921–2012), diplomat

Unplaced branches
Karl Anders Pousette (1792–1873), jeweler, goldsmith, of "unknown mother"
Mauritz Pousette (1824–1883), actor, married Charlotte Pousette (née Nordgren) and then to Johanna Vilhelmina Hagelin
Mauritz Ingemar Pousette (1881–1952), engineer
Carl-Gustaf Pousette (1912–1966), engineer
Madeleine Pousette, journalist

Anna Pousette, married with Anders Lundström, churchwarden in Adolf Fredrik, Stockholm
Anna de Wahl (1844–1889), actress, married to Oscar de Wahl, composer, conductor, arranger
Anders de Wahl (1869–1956), actor

References

Swedish-language surnames
Pousette family
Swedish families of Walloon ancestry